Vadouvan (occasionally spelled vaudouvan) is a ready-to-use blend of spices that is a French derivative of a masala known as vadavam, vadagam, or vadakam. It is an Indian curry blend with added aromatics such as shallots and garlic. The spice blend is thought to have originated from French colonial influence in the Puducherry region of India.

Indian recipes for vadouvan blends vary but, at a minimum, must contain pounded onion, garlic, cumin seeds, mustard seeds and fenugreek. The mixture is dried in the sun and then crushed, mixed with castor oil, which has preservative properties, and rolled into balls, which are then dried for several more days.

Similarly, Western recipes for vadouvan use onions, garlic, spices and oil, but the drying is done using an oven.

References

See also
List of herbs and spices
Seasoning

Herb and spice mixtures
French cuisine
Culture of Puducherry